Uppena is an Indian Telugu language soap opera premiered on 4 April 2022 airing on Gemini TV every Monday to Saturday and it is available for worldwide streaming on Sun NXT. The show stars Soniya Suresh, Sheela Singh, Swetha and Vijaya Kotla in leading roles. The serial is the remake of tamil television series Ethirneechal which is being aired on SunTV.

Plot
Chakravarthy and Parvati left their family as they married against their parents wishes. They were supported by Parvathi’s brother. Janani was born and always lived under the shadow of her father Chakravarthy. Janani met her best friend Gowtham in the college though her father didn’t like. Due to events, Gowtham left college makes Janani to feel very depressed. She overcomes everything and became a topper. She lives with a sister Anjana and her cousins. 

Gogineni Sivaram who is a business tycoon from Vijayawada came for a wedding proposal to Janani for his brother Abhiram. Initially Janani is not willing to marry, but later accepted after knowing Abhi’s innocence. 
All the in-laws of Gogineni's family are well educated but treated as housewives in the house. Janani doesn’t know the truth of the Gogineni brothers and Janani thinks Saraswathi, Gayathri and Vidya work in offices.

All brothers except Abhiram are misogynistic and abusive their wives. Their kids and their sister Roopa also disrespected them. Despite warnings from Vasu and respective in laws parent’s, Janani married Abhiram.
Sivaram assured a MD post for Janani for the new company but in reality it’s smell a rat. 
Finally Janani comes to know the true reality and Abhiram comforts her.

Now the story will explore how the Abhiram and Janani fight against the Gogineni brothers? How their Co sisters helps her will form a rest Cruz.

Cast

Main cast
Soniya Suresh as Janani, Abhiram's wife and youngest daughter in law of Gogineni's family
Sheela Singh as Saraswathi, Sivaram's wife and elder daughter in law of Gogineni's family
Swetha as Gayathri, Raghuram's wife and second daughter in law of Gogineni's family
Madhu Krishnan / Vijaya Kotla  as Vidya, Kalyanram's wife and third daughter in law of Gogineni's family

Supporting cast
Nanda Kishore as Gogineni Sivaram
Sujith Gowda as Abhiram, Sivaram's youngest brother and Janani's husband
Deepika as Bhanumathi, Sivaram, Raghuram, Kalyanram and Abhiram's mother
Suresh as Raghuram, Sivaram's younger brother
Chakravarthy as Kalyanram, Sivaram's younger brother
Raj Kumar as Chakravarthy, Janani's father
Jyothi Kiran as Parvathi, Janani's mother
Lohith as Vishwanath, Janani's uncle
Lavanya as Janani's aunt
Sanyu / Gaurav Varma as Gowtham, Janani's friend
Mythili Raju as Vasu, Janani's cousin
Yarlagadda Sailaja / Fathima Babu as Ghattamaneni Visalakshi (Sivaram, Raghuram, Kalyanram and Abhiram's grand mother)
Visweswara Rao as Saraswathi's father
J L Srinivas as SKR, Sivaram's business rival
Sailatha as Charulatha, SKR's wife
Karthik Prasad as Bhargav, SKR's younger brother
Mounika as Roopa, Sivaram, Raghuram and Kalyanram's sister
Javali as Anjana, Janani's sister
Charan as Suraj, Janani's cousin
Baby Shravya as Aishwarya, Sivaram's daughter
Baby Geethika as Apoorva, Raghuram's daughter
Baby Gowthami as Ikyatha, Kalyanram's daughter
Navya as Dharani, Abhiram's Ex-fiancee
Jyothi Swaroopa as Rani, Gogineni family house maid 
K S Raju as Panakalu, Sivaram's sidekick

Adaptations

References

Indian television soap operas
Telugu-language television shows
2022 Indian television series debuts
Gemini TV original programming
Telugu-language television series based on Tamil-language television series